Lorne W. R. Mulloy  (April 14, 1876 - February 21, 1932) was a Canadian soldier, hero of the Boer War, professor at the Royal Military College of Canada, and prominent lawyer. He was blinded in both eyes at the Battle of Witpoort and was awarded the Distinguished Conduct Medal.

Early life
Lorne Winfield Redmond Mulloy was born on April 14, 1876, on a farm in North Dundas, Ontario, near the villages of Winchester and Chesterville. His father, George Mulloy (1815-1888) was born in Ireland and had served with the Dundas County Militia at the Battle of the Windmill in 1838. His mother, Mary Redmond (1835-1917) was born in Matilda, Dundas County. Her father, Marcus Redmond (1797-1889), had fought with the Dundas County Militia at the Battle of Crysler's Farm in 1813, her paternal grandfather, Nicholas Redmond (1760-), had fought with the Prince of Wales' American Regiment in the American Revolution, while her maternal grandfather, Johannes Ault (1765-1851), had served with the King's Royal Regiment of New York.

Mulloy attended local schools in Dundas before becoming principal at a school in Navan. While serving as principal, the Second Boer War broke out, and patriotic fever swept the country and although he had planned on attending university, Mulloy could not turn down his chance to serve. He joined the local cavalry regiment, The Princess Louise Dragoon Guards, and on December 28, 1899, he was selected as part of a group of ten men from Ottawa to join the mounted contingent bound for South Africa, along with Edward James Gibson Holland who would win the Victoria Cross.

Military service
Once enlisted in Ottawa, Mulloy and the others were shipped to Montreal, where they received uniforms and equipment, and thence to Halifax for further training and embarkment. On February 21, 1900, they sailed for Cape Town, arriving in March and proceeding at once to the front. Mulloy and the Canadian Mounted Rifles fought at the Battle of Kroonstad, Battle of Doornkop, and the Battle of Diamond Hill. Throughout June and July, they were stationed in Johannesburg and Pretoria, fighting off Boer attempts at recapture. 

On July 12, the British and Canadian forces conducted an advance from the capital against the Boers, taking up defensive positions at Witpoort and Koffeyspruit. On July 16, 1900, the Boers launched an attack on the positions, and the Canadian Mounted Rifles, under the command of Harold Lothrop Borden, fought desperately on the kopjes. The Canadians were ordered to mount and, riding at full gallop, headed for a ridge while shells and bullets flew through the air around them. The troops arrived at the ridge,
dismounted and swarmed up the steep slope, reaching the summit as the enemy took cover among various boulders. The Canadians attacked under heavy fire, and rushed forward to secure the top of the ridge. Lieutenant J.E. Burch of the 2nd RCD, whose father was in the same unit, and four soldiers, including Mulloy, found them selves cut off from their comrades and heavily outnumbered by the enemy. Sergeant A.E. Rose described the engagement:

“The part of the kopje which Lieut. Borden went over was about 12 feet high, with front almost perpendicular. Before reaching the steepest part of the hill Trooper Brown fell, shot through the lung. Lieut. Borden and the remainder of his troop climbed the steep hill and found them selves face to face with the Boers. Lieut. Burch and his men were advancing along the side and near the foot of the kopje. The Boers and Canadians now held peculiar positions. Some of the Boers managed to get behind part of the Canadians placing the last named in a critical position. Soon after mounting the kopje poor Borden fell, a Mauser bullet piercing his heart. Lieut. Burch and four troopers found them selves in advance of the other Canadians with the Boers in front and behind them. The Boers called on them to surrender, but the five plucky Canadians refused to surrender, and kept the Boers at bay. Two rifles choked, yet the remaining three continued to keep the Boers off. Then Lieut. Burch received a wound in the left knee. He continued to fire and was in the act of raising his rifle when a Mauser bullet hit him in the side, causing a fatal wound. But the Boer who com mitted the deed also fired his last shot, as he was knocked over at the same time. One of the remaining four men - Mulloy of Ottawa - raised his head and immediately a bullet carried of his nose. Poor fellow! He may lose the sight of both eyes. Corp. Price was just an instant too late in firing at the Boer who caused Mulloy’s wound but he prevented him from ever firing again. Mulloy had left the cover of a boulder to take the rifle of a wounded Boer; his own weapon had jammed while Mulloy was giving his bandolier to Corporal Price, who was running short of ammunition. Two Boers fired at him from about forty feet away; one bullet grazed his forehead and the other struck him in the left eye. Mulloy dropped to his knees and did not lose consciousness but attempted to find cover. His comrades fired on the enemy who surrendered or fled."

This engagement became famous in Canada, not only because of the bravery of the soldiers, but because of the deaths of the two officers, notably Lieutenant Borden, the only son of the Minister of Militia. Mulloy's wound was serious, but not fatal, though he lost his sight in both eyes, being the only fully blind Canadian casualty of the war. He was treated at field hospitals in South Africa until September, when he proceeded to England for further rehabilitation and finally back to Canada in mid-December, 1900.

For his gallant conduct at the Battle of Witpoort on July 16, 1900, Trooper Lorne Mulloy was awarded the second highest military honour for bravery, the Distinguished Conduct Medal. Mulloy received the medal on September 21, 1901, at a ceremony at the Parliament buildings in Ottawa during the royal visit of the Duke of Cornwall. The Duke presented the medal and spoke with Mulloy about the battle. The scene motivated the 'Matters Military column' in the Ottawa Journal to reflect on the fortunes of war:

“Perhaps the most touching scene ever witnessed in Ottawa was that of Lieutenant Ed Holland, V.C., leading blind Trooper Mulloy before the Duke and Duchess to receive his decoration. Lieut. Holland has escaped unscathed to wear the emblem of his valor and to be recognized as a man who has won the highest distinction in the British army, while poor Mulloy, just as willing, just as brave, just as true, has been deemed to go through the world in darkness.

Public career
Following his return from the Boer War and recuperation from his wound, Mulloy was determined to live not only a normal life, but a life of service and hard work. He attended Queen's University and graduated in 1906 with an honours degree in Philosophy and Political Economy. Mulloy proved to be an outstanding student, being president of his year and critic for the Alma Mater Society. With support from the Canadian Patriotic Fund, Mulloy attended Balliol College, Oxford, graduating with distinction in 1910 with a Masters in Political Economy.

In the 1910s, Mulloy worked hard to promote stronger ties between Britain and Canada, becoming an accomplished speaker and debater. When he returned to Canada, he was appointed a professor of Military History and Strategy at the Royal Military College of Canada. On March 4, 1911, Lorne Mulloy married Jean Munro, a well-known soprano who had studied at the Boston Conservatory of Music. Jean Munro would be the author of various patriotic marches and tunes during the First World War; including the Trooper Mulloy March and Johnnie Canuck's the Boy.

During the First World War, Mulloy served as Honorary Colonel to the 146th Battalion, CEF and was at the forefront of promoting the war effort. He gave numerous talks and speeches, and was a prominent member of the Canadian National Service League, advocating for conscription in 1917.

Later life
Following the war, Mulloy returned to Dundas County, settling in Iroquois and began to study law. He was called to the bar on November 22, 1923, and practiced in Iroquois and Morrisburg. Mulloy became widely known in the legal community in Ontario, and was active in politics and local affairs in Dundas County.

He had a strong interest in the community sports teams, being president of the St. Lawrence Senior Hockey League, Vice President of the St. Lawrence Junior Hockey League, and Vice President of the St. Lawrence Box Lacrosse League. He was an active man even into his later life, with a keen interest in horse riding, sailing and golf.

Death

On February 20, 1932, Mulloy  attended a hockey game and presented the championship trophy to the Iroquois Junior Hockey Club. The next day, February 21, he walked up stairs to his bed. Shortly after sending his wife Jean downstairs to get news from the radio he suffered a heart attack and died. His funeral, held three days later, was attended by two thousand people; schools and businesses had been closed in the area. Mulloy was buried with full military honors under the direction of the 4th Princess Louise Dragoon Guards, the regiment Mulloy had first enlisted with in 1899. The cortege was led by the hearse carrying the flag-draped casket followed by a lone soldier leading a black cavalry horse with the boots reversed in the stirrups. There were at least seventy-five veterans of the South African and the First World War at the funeral, including Major G.H. Collins, who had served with Mulloy 30 years earlier at the fateful Battle of Witpoort. Mulloy was buried along the banks of his beloved St. Lawrence River at the Point Iroquois United Church cemetery. His beloved wife Jean, devastated by the loss of her husband, died two years later and was buried with her husband.

See also
Dundas County, Ontario
Second Boer War
Canadian Mounted Rifles

References

4th Princess Louise Dragoon Guards soldiers
1876 births
1932 deaths
Canadian Army soldiers
Canadian military personnel from Ontario
Canadian recipients of the Distinguished Conduct Medal